Sometimes They Come Back is a 1991 American made-for-television horror film based on the 1974 short story of the same name by Stephen King. Originally optioned as a segment of the 1985 feature film Stephen King's Cat's Eye, it was developed into a separate feature by producer Dino De Laurentiis.

Plot

Jim Norman, a high school history teacher struggling with emotional problems, returns to his old hometown after accepting a teaching job there. He moves back along with his wife, Sally, and their young son, Scott.

When Jim was nine, he had moved away from the small town with his parents after he had witnessed his older brother, Wayne, being murdered by a gang of greasers during a mugging in a train tunnel in 1963. Three of the murderers — Richard Lawson, Vinnie Vincent, and David North — were killed shortly afterwards by an oncoming steam train, having parked their 1955 Chevrolet One-Fifty on the tracks. The fourth member, Carl Mueller, ran off and survived.

Soon after he returns to his hometown, Jim starts having nightmares and flashbacks about his brother's murder. Soon afterwards, the ghosts of the three dead greasers chase Billy Sterns, one of Jim's students, to his death. Lawson, back from the dead, transfers into Jim's class. After the death of Kate, another of Jim's students, Vinnie also returns from the dead and transfers into Jim's class. The deaths of the two students are blamed as suicides.

Chip Conway, one of Jim's students, warns him that Richard and Vinnie are out for revenge. As he leaves Jim's home, Chip is attacked by the greasers, now joined with North, driving a 1955 Chevrolet One-Fifty. They kill Chip and throw his remains off of a bridge. Meanwhile, Jim has fallen under the suspicion of Pappas, the local police chief.

The three greasers have supernatural features: they cast no reflection in a mirror; can change their physical appearance to a demonic, mutilated look; are impervious to bullets; and can appear to some while invisible to others. They challenge Jim to a confrontation and make an attempt on his son's life with their car on the 27th anniversary of Wayne's murder.

Jim tracks down a retired policeman, Officer Neil, who reveals that he had been shot during a robbery and had been clinically dead for over three minutes, during which he encountered Wayne's spirit in the "mid-realm" – the dimension between the world of the living and one's final destination. Neil explains that Wayne is stuck there and sometimes when things are unsettled, spirits come back. Jim then tells Neil that the greasers all claimed to have transferred in from "Milford", but can't find any trace of a "Milford High School". Neil explains that it is not a school.

Jim goes to the Milford Cemetery and finds the graves of the three greasers, who once again confront him. They reveal to Jim that he is going to need Mueller to put everything together. Jim then tracks down Mueller, who panics and flees thinking Jim wants revenge. The greasers then attack Jim's family at their home. Jim fends them off and takes his family to a church, where they will be safe from the demonic gang. It is then revealed that when Jim was a boy, he had taken the murderers' car keys which led to their deaths. Jim realizes that he can't keep running and must deal with the past.

Jim returns to his abandoned childhood home and finds the old car keys that he took during the night of his brother's murder. He is joined by Mueller, who apologizes for Wayne's death and offers to help. The greasers attack again and take Mueller with them, reuniting their gang. Jim visits Wayne's grave seeking his help, but something blocks Wayne's return to the world of the living. In the meantime, the greasers lure Jim's family out of the church and take them prisoner.

Jim returns to the train tunnel in which Wayne's murder took place. The greasers plan to kill Jim the same way they murdered Wayne and take Jim with them, but Mueller switches sides and is killed by Lawson. The dying Mueller explains that for every life the greasers take, another can come back. A doorway to the afterlife opens, allowing Wayne to return. Wayne distracts the gang while Jim gets his family out of the gang's 1955 Chevrolet. Jim gives the gang back their car keys. Lawson promises to return, but Jim explains that there won't be a next time. The gang tries to escape in their car, only to have it struck by a ghost train that resembles the same one that killed them in 1963, which sends them to Hell.

Wayne is not aware that 27 years had passed, and Jim explains that he has grown up. Wayne can move on to Heaven and see his parents, and offers to have Jim come with him to the afterlife, but Jim refuses. Jim promises that they will be together again someday, and Wayne returns to the afterlife as Jim's family heads home.

Cast
 Tim Matheson as Jim Norman
 Zachary Ball as Young Jim Norman
 Brooke Adams as Sally Norman
 Chris Demetral as Wayne Norman
 Robert Rusler as Richard Lawson
 Robert Hy Gorman as Scott Norman
 Nicholas Sadler as Vinnie Vincent
 Bentley Mitchum as David North
 William Sanderson as Carl Mueller
 Don Ruffin as Young Carl Mueller
 Chadd Nyerges as Chip
 Tasia Valenza as Kate
 Matt Nolan as Billy Sterns
 William Kuhlke as Principal Simmons

Production notes
The original short story, "Sometimes They Come Back", is set in Stratford High School in Stratford, Connecticut. The film adaptation was filmed in Kansas City, Kansas, and Liberty, Missouri.

Director Tom McLoughlin previously directed the sixth Friday The 13th film: Jason Lives (1986).

The car used by the greasers was a 1955 Chevrolet One-Fifty.

The film is based on a short story by Stephen King that was first published in the March 1974 issue of Cavalier, and later collected in King's 1978 collection Night Shift.

The steam locomotive used in the film was Southern Pacific 5021 using Norfolk and Western 1218's whistle.

Reception
The film received an approval rating on 67% on review aggregator Rotten Tomatoes based on twelve reviews, its consensus reads: "Tim Matheson's gripping performance and a strong mood make Sometimes They Come Back an effective, if not wholly revelatory, Stephen King adaptation".

Ray Loynd of the Los Angeles Times called it "a tight, moody work".  TV Guide rated it a two out of five stars and wrote that "the solid cast can't lift the material above the routine".

Sequels
The TV film was followed by two straight-to-video sequels in 1996 (Sometimes They Come Back... Again) and 1998 (Sometimes They Come Back... for More).

Home media 
Sometimes They Come Back was originally released on VHS by Vidmark Entertainment, and later on DVD in 1999 by Trimark Home Video. On September 11, 2007, a new DVD edition of the film was released by 20th Century Fox Home Entertainment through the film's current owner, Metro-Goldwyn-Mayer. Olive Films released the film on Blu-Ray in October 2015.

References

External links
 
 
 

1991 television films
American supernatural horror films
Films about child death
Films directed by Tom McLoughlin
American horror television films
CBS network films
1991 horror films
1991 films
Demons in film
Films shot in Missouri
Films produced by Dino De Laurentiis
Films based on works by Stephen King
1990s English-language films
1990s American films